Đak Đoa is a district (huyện) of Gia Lai province in the Central Highlands region of Vietnam.

As of 2003 the district had a population of 85,362. The district covers an area of 980 km². The district capital lies at Đak Đoa.

References

Districts of Gia Lai province